Caught Up: Motion From the Motion Picture is the soundtrack to Darin Scott's 1998 crime film Caught Up. It was released on February 24, 1998 through Virgin Records's Noo Trybe label and consisted entirely of hip hop music. The soundtrack did fairly well on the Billboard charts, making it to #30 on the Billboard 200 and #6 on the Top R&B/Hip-Hop Albums.

Track listing

Charts

References

External links

1998 soundtrack albums
Drama film soundtracks
Hip hop soundtracks
Gangsta rap soundtracks
Virgin Records soundtracks
Albums produced by Bink (record producer)
Albums produced by Daz Dillinger
Albums produced by DJ Premier
Albums produced by DJ Quik
Albums produced by Jermaine Dupri
Albums produced by KRS-One
Albums produced by Mike Dean (record producer)
Albums produced by Soopafly
Albums produced by Soulshock and Karlin
Albums produced by The Legendary Traxster
Albums produced by True Master